John Stamper (born August 30, 1978) is a former American football defensive end who played for the Chicago Bears in 2002. He was drafted in the sixth round of the 2002 NFL Draft. He played college football at University of South Carolina.

References 

1978 births
Living people
American football defensive ends
South Carolina Gamecocks football players
Chicago Bears players